Afrikaneren is a 1966 Norwegian drama film directed by Barthold Halle, starring Earle Hyman and Wenche Foss. It deals with Raymond, a young South African studying in Norway.

External links
 
 Afrikaneren at Filmweb.no (Norwegian)

1966 films
1966 drama films
Norwegian drama films